The Confederação Brasileira de Beisebol e Softbol is the confederation responsible for baseball and softball in Brazil. Founded in 1990, the CBBS is headquartered in São Paulo and has a mission to both organize the bat-and-ball games and popularize the sports in the country, as baseball is mostly restricted to the Japanese Brazilians. CBBS supports the Brazil national baseball team, and has 120 affiliated teams and 30,000 players.

References

External links
Site oficial da CBBS
Site oficial da IBAF
Site oficial da ISF
Fórum Strike Out
Site oficial da ABSBH

Sports governing bodies in Brazil
Baseball governing bodies
 
Softball governing bodies
 
Sports organizations established in 1990